(The Beginning and the End), sometimes also known as the  (History of Ibn Kathir), is a work on Islamic history by the Sunni Muslim scholar Ibn Kathir.

Overview 
The different volumes of the book deal with the beginning of creation and the sending of man upon the earth, the lives of the prophets, and the lives of the companions of Muhammad. The last volume records predictions of future events such as the signs of the day of judgment (Qiyama), when Muslims believe people will enter Janna (heaven) or Jahannam (hell).

See also 

 List of Sunni books

References 

Sunni literature